Karel Reisz (21 July 1926 – 25 November 2002) was a Czech-born British filmmaker, one of the pioneers of the new realist strain in British cinema during the 1950s and 1960s. Two of the best-known films he directed are Saturday Night and Sunday Morning (1960), a classic of kitchen sink realism, and the romantic period drama The French Lieutenant's Woman (1981).

Early life
Reisz was born in Ostrava, Czechoslovakia of Jewish extraction. His father was a lawyer. He was a refugee, one of the 669 rescued by Sir Nicholas Winton.

He came to England in 1938, speaking almost no English, but eradicated his foreign accent as quickly as possible. After attending Leighton Park School, he joined the Royal Air Force toward the end of the war; his parents were murdered at Auschwitz. Following his war service, he read Natural Sciences at Emmanuel College, Cambridge, and began to write for film journals, including Sight and Sound. He co-founded Sequence with Lindsay Anderson and Gavin Lambert in 1947.

Career

Free Cinema
Reisz was a founder member of the Free Cinema documentary film movement. His standard textbook The Technique of Film Editing was first published in 1953.

His first short film Momma Don't Allow (1955), co-written and co-directed with Tony Richardson, was included in the first Free Cinema program shown at the National Film Theatre in February 1956.

He produced Every Day Except Christmas (1957) directed by Lindsay Anderson and Band Wagon (1958).

Reisz and Anderson produced and directed March to Aldermaston (1959), then Reisz alone directed We Are the Lambeth Boys (1959), a naturalistic depiction of the members of a South London boys' club, unusual in showing the leisure life of working-class teenagers as it was, with skiffle music and cigarettes, cricket, drawing and discussion groups. The film represented Britain at the Venice Film Festival. (The BBC made two follow-up films about the same people and youth club, broadcast in 1985.) He produced I Want to Go to School (1959) directed  by John Krish.

Early features
His first feature film Saturday Night and Sunday Morning (1960) was based on the social-realism novel by Alan Sillitoe, and used many of the same techniques as his earlier documentaries. In particular, scenes filmed at the Raleigh factory in Nottingham have the look of a documentary, and give the story a vivid sense of verisimilitude. The film won the Grand Award for Best Feature Film at the 1961 Mar del Plata International Film Festival. It was successful at the box office and made a film star of Albert Finney.

Reisz directed a TV series Adventure Story (1961). He produced Anderson's feature directorial debut This Sporting Life (1963), then he and Finney reunited on Night Must Fall (1964).

Reisz directed Morgan – A Suitable Case for Treatment (1966) adapted by David Mercer from his 1962 television play.

His fourth feature as director was Isadora (1968), a biography of dancer Isadora Duncan, with a screenplay by Melvyn Bragg that starred Vanessa Redgrave.

Hollywood
Reisz's first film shot in America was The Gambler (1974) with James Caan.

He did Who'll Stop the Rain (1978) with Nick Nolte and Tuesday Weld. He was meant to follow it with an adaptation of Brian Moore's novel The Doctor's Wife based on a script by Joe Eszterhas, but the film was never made.

Back in London, he directed The French Lieutenant's Woman (1981), which was probably the most successful of his later films. Adapted from the John Fowles novel by Harold Pinter, it starred Jeremy Irons and Meryl Streep. In 1982 he directed John Guare's Gardenia Dreams on stage in Boston. 
 
He did Sweet Dreams (1985), based on the life of country singer Patsy Cline, starring Jessica Lange. After it he did a script about Libby Holman for Ray Stark but it was never made.

Later career
Reisz's last feature was Everybody Wins (1990), with a screenplay by Arthur Miller and based on his play.

From 1991 to 2001, Reisz focused on theatre directing in London, Dublin and Paris. He directed an adaptation of The Deep Blue Sea (1994) for British TV. In 1995, he directed Moonlight by Harold Pinter with Jason Robards and Blythe Danner. At a Beckett festival at Lincoln Center in 1996, he directed Happy Days. In 1999, he did Pinter's Ashes to Ashes, with Lindsay Duncan and David Strathairn at the Roundabout Theater Company. At the Pinter Festival at Lincoln Center in 2001, he staged A Kind of Alaska and Landscape. When the Gate Theater filmed all Beckett's stage plays, Reisz did Act Without Words I (2001).

Personal life

Reisz had three sons by his first wife Julia Coppard, whom he later divorced. Reisz wed Betsy Blair, former wife of Gene Kelly, in 1963 and remained married until his death.

Filmography

Films
 Saturday Night and Sunday Morning (1960)
 Night Must Fall (1964)
 Morgan – A Suitable Case for Treatment (1966)
 Isadora (1968)
 The Gambler (1974)
 Who'll Stop the Rain (1978)
 The French Lieutenant's Woman (1981)
 Sweet Dreams (1985)
 Everybody Wins  (1990)

Short films

 Momma Don't Allow  1955 (documentary)
 Every Day But Christmas 1957 (documentary about Covent Garden Market)
 We Are the Lambeth Boys 1958 (documentary) 
 March to Aldermaston 1959 (documentary) about the first of the Aldermaston Marches

Television
 Adventure Story (1961) (6 episodes)
 Performance (TV series) (1 episode) (1994)

Book

References

External links 

1926 births
2002 deaths
Alumni of Emmanuel College, Cambridge
BAFTA winners (people)
Czech people of Jewish descent
Czechoslovak emigrants to the United Kingdom
Kindertransport refugees
English film directors
English film producers
English-language film directors
English people of Czech-Jewish descent
People educated at Leighton Park School
Film people from Ostrava
Social realism
20th-century English businesspeople